Hans Morten Thrane Esmark (21 August 1801 – 24 April 1882)  was a Norwegian priest and mineralogist. He is most noted for first locating the mineral  thorite.

Biography
Morten Thrane Esmark was born at Kongsberg in Buskerud, Norway as a son of Professor Jens Esmark, a  professor of mineralogy. His given name came from his maternal grandfather Danish zoologist and mineralogist, Morten Thrane Brünnich. Esmark took his theological exam in 1825 and first began his ministry as chaplain at Eidanger in Tromsø, Troms, Norway.  He served as a parish priest for a period at Ramnes in Jarlsberg.  He later served as vicar at Brevik in Telemark.

Morten Thrane Esmark described several new minerals principally from  Langesundsfjorden in Telemark. He commonly sent interesting specimens to his father, Jens Esmark, who was a professor of mineralogy and geology at the Royal Frederick University.   Morten Thrane Esmark located the  first specimens of thorite, from which the element thorium is derived, on the island of Løvøya near Porsgrunn. His father forwarded the specimen to Swedish chemist Jöns Jacob Berzelius, who confirmed  that it was a new mineral which contained a new element. The personal mineral collection of Morten Thrane Esmark was later donated to the Tromsø University Museum.

Personal life
He was married to Ulriche Benedicte Wiborg (1810–1898). Nature researcher  Birgitte Esmark (1841–1897) was their daughter.

References

Related reading
Larsen, Alf Olav   (2010) The Langesundsfjord – History, Geology, Pegmatites, Minerals ( Bode Verlag GmbH)

External links
Hans Morten Thrane Esmark. Presten Esmark og hans arbeide for vor bys utvikling (H. H. Steen and Nicolay W. Coch. Breviks Historielag. December 20, 1926.) 
Rediscovery of the Elements: Thorium (Marshall, James L. & Marshall, Virginia R. The Hexagon, Volume 92, Number 4, Winter 2001)

1801 births
1882 deaths
Clergy from Kongsberg
Norwegian mineralogists
19th-century Norwegian Lutheran clergy